Videopolis is an American dance show that aired on the Disney Channel from 1987 to 1989.

Synopsis
Segments included the line dance, dance contests, and a segment where a pair of feet dancing are seen while the dancer's face appears on the screens. Among the acts that performed on Videopolis included Debbie Gibson, New Kids on the Block, Tiffany, New Edition, Menudo, Pebbles, Janet Jackson, The Jets, and many others. There was also a monthly show called Videopolis: Startracks that ran between 1987 and 1990.

References

1987 American television series debuts
1989 American television series endings
Dance television shows
Pop music television series
American children's musical television series
1980s American children's television series
1980s American music television series
English-language television shows